Parajanov: The Last Spring is a 1992 award-winning documentary by the Russian-Armenian filmmaker Mikhail Vartanov, that also includes the complete surviving footage of Sergei Parajanov's unfinished last film The Confession, Vartanov's behind-the-scenes sequences of Parajanov at work on the shooting of the Color of Pomegranates and other material. Featured in 7th Annual Russian Academy of Cinema Arts Awards (1993).

Awards and honors
2003—Beverly Hills Film Festival: Golden Palm Award
1993—Nika Awards: Best Documentary Film
1995—San Francisco International Film Festival: Golden Gate Award
2012— Busan International Film Festival: Eternal Travelers for Freedom Retrospective

Quotes
"Mikhail Vartanov...made a wonderful film Parajanov: The Last Spring." Martin Scorsese 
"Mikhail Vartanov's film Parajanov: The Last Spring...exemplifies the power of art over any limitations." Francis Ford Coppola

Bibliography

Dixon & Foster. "A Short History of Film." New Brunswick, NJ: Rutgers University Press, 2008. 
Schneider, Steven. "501 Directores de Cine." Barcelona, Spain: Grijalbo, 2008. 
"Francis Ford Coppola recognizes…" Hollywood Reporter (20 October 2015)
Perreault, Luc. "Paradjanov - The Last Spring." "La Presse" a12, 14 June 1994 (French language)
Thomas, Kevin. "Intoxicating spirit." "Los Angeles Times" (1 January 2004).

References

External links
Parajanov.com

Francis Ford Coppola about Parajanov: The Last Spring
Channel 1 Moscow on Parajanov: The Last Spring
Parajanov: The Last Spring TV clip

1990s Russian-language films
Armenian-language films
English-language Armenian films
American documentary films
1992 films
1992 documentary films
Armenian documentary films
1992 multilingual films
Armenian multilingual films
1990s American films